Tribal Tech is the fourth album by the jazz fusion band Tribal Tech, released in 1991.

Track listing
 "Signal Path" (Scott Henderson) – 6:26
 "Big Girl Blues" (Scott Henderson) – 6:15
 "Dense Dance" (Gary Willis, Scott Henderson) – 4:51
 "Got Tuh B" (Gary Willis, Scott Henderson) – 6:43
 "Peru" (Scott Henderson) – 7:23
 "Elvis At The Hop" (Scott Henderson) – 4:34
 "The Necessary Blonde" (Gary Willis, Scott Henderson) – 6:52
 "Fight The Giant" (David Goldblatt) – 4:05
 "Sub Aqua" (Scott Henderson) – 5:30
 "Formula One" (Scott Henderson) – 4:44
 "Wasteland" (Gary Willis) – 8:03

Personnel
Scott Henderson - guitar, guitar synthesizer
Gary Willis - bass, synthesizers
David Goldblatt - keyboards
Joey Heredia - drums
Brad Dutz - percussion

References

1991 albums
Tribal Tech albums
Relativity Records albums